Dog Falls is the name of several waterfalls:

In Scotland:
Dog Falls, Glen Affric
In Canada:
Dog Falls, Nova Scotia